Curtiss-Wright Hangar may refer to:

Curtiss-Wright Hangars 1 and 2, Cahokia, Illinois, listed on the NRHP in St. Clair County, Illinois
Curtiss-Wright Hangar (Columbia, South Carolina), listed on the NRHP in Columbia, South Carolina